Virna De Angeli (born 27 February 1976 in Gravedona) is an Italian former sprinter.

Biography
In her career she won 10 national championships. She is the wife of the 2004 Summer Olympics marathon champion, Stefano Baldini. The couple has two daughters, Alessia (born 2001) and Laura (born 2012).

National records
 4x400 metres relay: 3'26"69 ( Paris, 20 June 1999) – with Francesca Carbone, Patrizia Spuri, Danielle Perpoli
 4x400 metres relay indoor: 3'35"01 ( Ghent, 27 February 2000) – with Francesca Carbone, Patrizia Spuri, Carla Barbarino

Achievements

National titles
 2 wins in 200 metres at the Italian Athletics Championships (1996, 1997)
 2 wins in 200 metres at the Italian Athletics Indoor Championships (1996, 1997)
 3 wins in 400 metres at the Italian Athletics Championships (1999, 2003, 2004)
 1 win in 400 metres at the Italian Athletics Indoor Championships (1999)
 1 win in 400 metres hurdles at the Italian Athletics Championships (1994)

See also
 Italian all-time top lists – 200 metres
 Italian all-time top lists – 400 metres
 Italian all-time lists – 400 metres hurdles

References

External links
 

1976 births
Italian female sprinters
Italian female hurdlers
Living people
Sportspeople from the Province of Como
Athletes (track and field) at the 1996 Summer Olympics
Athletes (track and field) at the 2000 Summer Olympics
Olympic athletes of Italy
Mediterranean Games gold medalists for Italy
Athletes (track and field) at the 1997 Mediterranean Games
World Athletics Championships athletes for Italy
Mediterranean Games medalists in athletics
20th-century Italian women
21st-century Italian women